St Thomas Church, Crookes — now known as ‘STC Sheffield’ — is an ecumenical church with united Anglican and Baptist traditions, in Crookes, Sheffield, England. The building still retains most of its original architecture, although a substantial expansion was made in the 1980s.

History 
Previous vicars of note include Mike Breen and Mick Woodhead.

Architecture 
The church is a classic Victorian church with a square tower and gothic arch stained glass windows.

References

External links

 St. Thomas' Church, Crookes official site
 Church for Students
 Diocese of Sheffield website

Churches in Sheffield